André Tassin (born 23 February 1902 in Arras, Pas de Calais - died 12 July 1986 in Reims, Champagne-Ardenne) was a French footballer. He played as goalkeeper for RC France.

A reserve for Alex Thépot at the 1930 FIFA World Cup, Tassin played for France in 1932.

Playing career
 RC France (1929–1934)
 Amiens SC (1934–1935)
 Stade de Reims (1935–1936)

Honours
 International in 1932 (5 caps)
 Finalist of the Coupe de France 1930 (with RC France)

External links
 
 
Page at fff.fr 

French footballers
France international footballers
Amiens SC players
Stade de Reims players
Racing Club de France Football players
1902 births
Sportspeople from Arras
1930 FIFA World Cup players
1986 deaths
Association football goalkeepers
Footballers from Hauts-de-France